George Shinn (born May 11, 1941) is the former owner of the Charlotte/New Orleans Hornets, as well as the Charlotte Knights and Gastonia Rangers minor league baseball teams, along with the Raleigh–Durham Skyhawks, of the World League of American Football.  He purchased the Hornets for $32.5 million in 1987. In 1997, he lost his bid for a potential National Hockey League (NHL) expansion franchise to be called the Hampton Roads Rhinos.

Early life and education
Shinn was born in Kannapolis, North Carolina and attended A. L. Brown High School.

Career
Shinn worked in a textile mill, a car wash, and as a school janitor. He later attended Evans Business College in Concord, North Carolina while working with real estate and car dealerships. Upon graduating, he raised enough money to buy Evans and other small colleges that offered 18-24 month programs, consolidating them all under the umbrella company Rutledge Education Systems. He sold the schools and bought the basketball team with the proceeds.

The George Shinn Foundation was founded in 1973. Its mission is to provide need-based scholarships for deserving students. In 2011, George and his wife, Denise, moved the family and the foundation to Nashville, Tennessee. Foundation funds are also used to educate others on the importance of early testing and diagnosis of prostate cancer (Shinn is a prostate cancer survivor). Other Foundation initiatives include the establishment and support program for students at Fruitland Baptist Bible Institute in Hendersonville, North Carolina, which prepares students for ministry, and an ongoing school/orphanage/church project in the Port-au-Prince suburb of Tabarre, Haiti. In 2012, the George Shinn Foundation was able to provide funding to complete a multi-story medical clinic, which will provide medical care to the community surrounding the Amer-Haitian Bon Zami House of Hope. Hoops for Homes was created by the Shinn Foundation directly following Hurricane Katrina to rebuild homes in the New Orleans community.  The project provided funding and repairs for more than 65 homes. George Shinn partnered with Nashville non-profit, Room In the Inn, and donated more than 60 pairs of shoes during the 2012 holiday season. Room In the Inn is a ministry serving the homeless.

Denise Shinn, George's wife, serves as the Foundation's president.

Awards and honors
 2009 – Weiss Award (New Orleans Council for Community and Justice)
 2009 – American Red Cross Humanitarian of the Year (New Orleans chapter)
 1975 Horatio Alger Award. The youngest ever (at the time) at 34.

Writings
Shinn is the author of half a dozen books including The Miracle of Motivation, The American Dream Still Works, and You Gotta Believe! The Story of the Charlotte Hornets.

Sexual assault trial and departure of team to New Orleans

Shinn was accused of kidnapping and sexually assaulting a Charlotte woman. A jury rejected the claims at trial in December 1999, but Shinn admitted in court to having two sexual relationships outside of his marriage, which damaged his reputation. The trial was broadcast nationwide on Court TV and drew some of the cable network's highest ratings at the time.

The trial and his subsequent tarnished reputation was one of the key reasons for the move from Charlotte to New Orleans.

Hornets buyout
In April 2010, Shinn started considering selling his majority share of the Hornets to Gary Chouest, who had bought 25% of the team. The negotiations stalled due to the team's financial issues.  Because Shinn was not in a financial position to continue to run the team, the NBA was expected to purchase and run the team while looking for a local owner.  The NBA completed its purchase of the Hornets from George Shinn and Gary Chouest in December 2010 for an estimated $300 million.

Personal life
Shinn has three children from his first marriage. One of his children is Chris Shinn.  He was the lead singer of the rock band Live from March 2012 until December 2016, and is more known for his work with Unified Theory and his own solo albums. 

In November 2009 Shinn announced he had prostate cancer. By March 2010, after several months of treatment, he announced he was cancer-free. Shinn also survived a stroke suffered early in the Hornets' inaugural season.

Although Shinn later relinquished control of the Hornets and retired, he is still hated in Charlotte, not only for moving the team to New Orleans, but also for trading player Alonzo Mourning in 1995. Shinn has not returned to Charlotte since the Hornets left for New Orleans in 2002.  In a 2008 interview with The Charlotte Observer, Shinn admitted that the drama over his personal life was a factor in the Hornets leaving town.  He also said that if he had it to do all over again, he would not have withdrawn from public view as he did after the sexual assault trial.

Net worth
In 2010 the former New Orleans Hornets owner had an estimated net worth of $100 million.

References

External links
George Shinn website
George Shinn Foundation
Article from Business Week

1941 births
Living people
National Basketball Association executives
National Basketball Association owners
People from Kannapolis, North Carolina